A core outcome set (COS) is a consensus-derived collection of outcomes and instruments that allows researchers to measure a consistent set of clinical endpoints in studies of a health condition. Core outcome sets are developed through an evidence-based and iterative process during which all possible outcomes for a health condition are methodologically gathered and then selected by an international group of experts and patients.

Terminology 
The term core outcome refers to a short list of clinical endpoints deemed most important to patients, providers, and researchers related to a health condition. The term core outcome should not be confused with the term outcome, which refers to any clinical endpoint that can be measured in research, regardless of importance.

Similarly, core outcomes are distinct from core outcome measurement instruments (also known as core outcome measures). While core outcomes provide guidance on what to measure in clinical studies, core outcome measurement instruments provide guidance on how to measure those selected outcomes.

A core outcome set can be composed of core outcomes alone, or of both core outcomes and the associated measurement instruments. General categories of core outcomes may be referred to as outcome domains. In some cases, a core outcome may also be a core outcome measure (e.g., patient weight).

Scope 
Core outcome sets are commonly used by clinical investigators who conduct clinical trials for the treatment of a health condition. The patient population associated with a particular core outcome set may vary, as some apply to all patients with that health condition and others apply to a small subset of that population. Core outcome sets are typically used in research, but they may also be used for patient management during routine clinical care.

The need to develop core outcome sets was initially identified by methodologists and aggregators of systematic reviews, like Cochrane, who observed that meta-analyses of trials of similar conditions were frequently impeded by the lack of similarity among the outcomes and outcome measures they employed.

Methodology 
In general, the process for selecting a core outcome set requires a rigorous methodology in which outcomes are first pooled from all possible sources and then subsequently prioritized during a consensus process.

A long list of outcomes is first developed by means of systematic reviews, literature reviews, and reviews of patient resources. Additional outcomes are identified by interviewing those with further personal, professional or scientific knowledge of the health condition, such as patients, representatives of patient support groups, physicians and other clinicians, industry scientists, and healthcare regulators.

After a list of potential outcomes is identified, an international group of experts and patients then select the outcomes most important to them by a consensus process, commonly the Delphi technique or nominal group technique.

For each of the selected outcomes, core outcome measures are identified and then selected through a process similar to that of core outcomes.

The selected list of outcomes and outcome measures is then published and disseminated for use by clinical trialists. Uptake of the core outcome set, or its active use by trialists, is encouraged.

Examples of core outcome set initiatives 
The first initiative to standardize outcomes was led in 1970 by the World Health Organization (WHO), which attempted to create a set of outcomes for clinical trials in cancer. Since then, numerous initiatives have been created to both develop core outcome sets and provide resources for other groups.

Core outcomes in rheumatology

OMERACT 
Over 40 core outcome sets related to rheumatology have been developed by The Outcome Measures in Rheumatology (OMERACT) collaboration, including those for fibromyalgia, gout, and osteoporosis. In addition to developing core outcome sets in rheumatology, OMERACT publishes resources and handbooks for researchers across all specialties.

General initiatives

COMET 
The Core Outcome Measures in Effectiveness Trials (COMET) group is an international collaboration that provides extensive methodological support to all groups developing core outcome sets. COMET was first launched in 2010 and is currently led by Dr. Paula Williamson.

Core outcomes in dermatology

CS-COUSIN 
The Cochrane Skin - Core Outcome Set Initiative (CS-COUSIN) group was created with the aim of developing core outcome sets in dermatology and providing methodological support to core outcome set developers. CS-COUSIN is affiliated with the development of 18 dermatologic core outcome sets, including those for vitiligo, eczema, and acne.

IMPROVED 
The Measurement of Priority Outcome Variables in Dermatologic Surgery group (IMPROVED), led by Dr. Murad Alam, is an international collaboration of dermatologic surgeons that has developed core outcomes for various dermatologic surgery conditions. Notably, the IMPROVED group has developed core outcome sets for cutaneous squamous cell carcinoma, basal cell carcinoma, and actinic keratosis.

Core outcome in women's health

CROWN 
Six core outcome sets have been developed by the Core Outcomes in Women's and Newborn's Health (CROWN) collaboration for various health conditions relevant to women's health. Notable sets include those for diabetes in pregnancy, preterm birth, and maternity care.

Access to core outcome sets 
Core outcome sets that are published or are in development can be found in a database maintained by the COMET initiative. The database is refreshed annually by a systematic review of core outcome set studies.

References 

Clinical research
Clinical data management